Sir Sydney Alfred Smith CBE OPR FRSE LLD (4 August 1883 in Roxburgh, New Zealand – 8 May 1969 in Edinburgh, Scotland), was a renowned forensic scientist and pathologist. From 1928 to 1953, Smith was Regius Professor of Forensic Medicine at the University of Edinburgh, a well-known forensic department of that time. Smith's popular 1959 autobiography, Mostly Murder, has run through many British and American editions, the latest in 1988.

Life
Smith was born at Roxburgh, Otago, in New Zealand the son of Mary Elizabeth Wilkinson and James Jackson Smith.

He was educated at Roxburgh public school, and Victoria College, Wellington. He later won a Vans Dunlop scholarship to study botany and zoology at the University of Edinburgh. He transferred to medicine and graduated with an MB ChB in 1912, with first-class honours, and then undertook a research scholarship, receiving a Diploma in Public Health (DPH) in 1913.

Following a short period in general practice, Smith became an assistant in at the University of Edinburgh department of forensic medicine at the suggestion of Professor Henry Harvey Littlejohn. He obtained his doctorate (MD) in 1914 with a gold medal, and also won the Alison Prize.

Smith returned to New Zealand in 1914 and took up a post as Medical Officer of Health for Otago at Dunedin. During World War I, Smith served as a major in the New Zealand Army Corps. In 1917, Smith took up a post as medico-legal advisor to the Government of Egypt and senior lecturer in forensic medicine at the School of Medicine in Cairo. Smith went on to establish himself as an authority in the field of ballistics and firearms in forensic medicine, publishing the first edition of Textbook of Forensic Medicine in 1925.

In 1928, Smith was appointed to the Regius Chair of forensic medicine at the University of Edinburgh. In 1929 he was elected a Fellow of the Royal Society of Edinburgh. His proposers were Sir Edmund Taylor Whittaker, Ralph Allan Sampson, Thomas James Jehu and James Ritchie.

In 1931 he became Dean of the Faculty of Medicine, a post he held until 1953 (succeeded by Professor Thomas J Mackie). During his period as Dean, in response to Polish medical students seeking refuge in Scotland, he was prominent in the discussions which led to the creation of the Polish School of Medicine in  Edinburgh in 1941. He was awarded the Order of Polonia Restituta (OPR) by the Polish government after the war. The school was disbanded in 1949.

In 1946, Smith was elected to the Aesculapian Club of Edinburgh. He was Rector of the University of Edinburgh from 1954 to 1957. He published an autobiography, Mostly Murder, in 1959.

In King's Birthday Honours 1944 Smith was appointed as a Commander of the Most Excellent Order of the British Empire. In the New Year Honours 1949 Smith was appointed as a Knight Bachelor and invested by King George VI on 4 March 1949. In 1955 the University of Edinburgh gave him an honorary doctorate (LLD) for his literary works.

He died on 8 May 1969 at his house "Rhycullen" in Edinburgh.

Artistic recognition

He was portrayed in office as Dean by William Oliphant Hutchison.

Family

In 1912 he married Catherine Goodsir Gelenick (d.1962). Their daughter, Catherine Mary Goodsir Smith, became a doctor and their son was the poet, artist and art critic Sydney Goodsir Smith.

Cases
Smith's first important forensic case was the 1913 trial of Patrick Higgins for the murder of his two sons in Winchburgh, Scotland, known as the Hopetoun Quarry murders. Because of the build-up of adipocere in the bodies, a result of their being immersed in a cold flooded quarry, Littlejohn and Smith were able to provide important evidence in the trial, leading to the conviction and execution of Higgins. The two scientists' famous work gained notoriety 94 years later, when a relative of the boys asked for the return of specimens taken from their remains from the University of Edinburgh, for a proper burial. Research revealed that after their work on the case, Littlejohn and Smith had removed parts of the bodies from police custody to use as scientific specimens, as described in Smith's autobiography, 

according to Chris Paton in The Scotsman. In January 2008, the university agreed to return the remains, if the claimant could establish her relationship and the other relatives all agreed.

In 1935, Smith was one of the forensic experts involved in the identification of the bodies of the victims of Buck Ruxton, using a novel technique of forensic anthropology to superimpose a photograph over the X-ray of a victim's skull.

Also in 1935, while on holiday in Australia, he was called to give evidence in the infamous Shark Arm case.

In 1937, Smith produced a profile of the Falkirk cat burglar, using a pair of shoes, predating the field of forensic podiatry.

One obituary of Smith recounted an incident in which he was brought "three small bones thought to belong to an animal", and from these was able to determine that they belonged to "a woman aged between 23 and 25 who had died three months earlier. She had at least one pregnancy, walked with a limp and was killed by a home-made shotgun slug".

Notes

References
 Oxford Dictionary of National Biography, "Smith, Sir Sydney Alfred" by Francis Camps
 Sydney Smith, Mostly Murder, Guild Publishing, 1986

1883 births
1969 deaths
People from Roxburgh, New Zealand
British forensic scientists
New Zealand expatriates in the United Kingdom
British pathologists
Commanders of the Order of the British Empire
Alumni of the University of Edinburgh
Academics of the University of Edinburgh
Rectors of the University of Edinburgh
Knights Bachelor